Erich Winkler (b. 17 February 1935 - d. 19 June 2017) is an Austrian ice hockey player. He competed in the men's tournament at the 1964 Winter Olympics.

References

1935 births
2017 deaths
Austrian ice hockey players
Ice hockey players at the 1964 Winter Olympics
Olympic ice hockey players of Austria
Sportspeople from Innsbruck
20th-century Austrian people